Three Little Pigs is an animated short film released on May 25, 1933 by United Artists, produced by Walt Disney and directed by Burt Gillett. Based on the fable of the same name, the Silly Symphony won the 1934 Academy Award for Best Animated Short Film of 1933. The short  cost $22,000 and grossed $250,000.

In 1994, it was voted #11 of the 50 Greatest Cartoons of all time by members of the animation field. In 2007, Three Little Pigs was selected for preservation in the United States National Film Registry by the Library of Congress as being "culturally, historically, or aesthetically significant".

Three Little Pigs premiered at the Radio City Music Hall as a short subject to Radio City's release of the First National Pictures film Elmer, the Great on May 25, 1933, in New York City.

Plot
Fifer Pig, Fiddler Pig and Practical Pig are three brothers who build their own houses. All three of them play a different kind of musical instrument – Fifer the flute, Fiddler the violin and Practical is initially seen as working without rest. Fifer and Fiddler build their straw and stick houses with much ease and have fun all day. Practical, on the other hand, "has no chance to sing and dance 'cause work and play don't mix," focusing on building his strong brick house. Fifer and Fiddler poke fun at him, but Practical warns them when the Wolf comes, they won't be able to escape. Fifer and Fiddler ignore him and continue to play, singing the now famous song, "Who's Afraid of the Big Bad Wolf?"

As they are singing, the Big Bad Wolf really comes by, at which point Fifer and Fiddler reveal that they are in fact very afraid of the wolf, so the two pigs each retreat to their respective houses. The Wolf first blows Fifer's house down (except for the roof) with little resistance and Fifer manages to escape and hides at Fiddler's house. The wolf pretends to give up and go home, but returns disguised as an innocent sheep. The pigs see through the disguise, whereupon the Wolf blows Fiddler's house down (except for the door). The two pigs manage to escape and hide at Practical's house, who willingly gives his brothers refuge; in Practical's house, it is revealed that his musical instrument is the piano. The Wolf arrives disguised as a door-to-door salesman to trick the pigs into letting him in, but fails. The Wolf then tries to blow down the strong brick house (losing his clothing in the process), but is unable, all while a confident Practical plays melodramatic piano music. Finally, he attempts to enter the house through the chimney, but smart Practical Pig takes off the lid of a boiling pot filled with water (to which he adds turpentine) under the chimney, and the Wolf falls right into it. Shrieking in pain, the Wolf runs away frantically, while the pigs sing Who's Afraid of the Big Bad Wolf? again. Practical then plays a trick by knocking on his piano, causing his brothers to think the Wolf has returned and hide under Practical's bed.

Voice cast
 Billy Bletcher as Big Bad Wolf
 Pinto Colvig as Practical Pig / Big Bad Wolf as Jewish Peddler (deleted from later versions)
 Dorothy Compton as Fifer Pig
 Mary Moder as Fiddler Pig

Reaction and legacy
The cartoon premiered on May 25, 1933, at Radio City Music Hall in New York City.

The cartoon was phenomenally successful with audiences of the day, so much that theaters ran the cartoon for months after its debut, to great financial response. The cartoon is still considered to be the most successful animated short ever made, and remained on top of animation until Disney was able to boost Mickey's popularity further by making him a top merchandise icon by the end of 1934.
Animator Chuck Jones observed,  "That was the first time that anybody ever brought characters to life [in an animated cartoon]. They were three characters who looked alike and acted differently". (Other animation historians, particularly admirers of Winsor McCay, would dispute the word "first," but Jones was not referring to personality as such but to characterization through posture and movement.) Fifer and Fiddler Pig are frivolous and care-free; Practical Pig is cautious and earnest.  The reason for why the film's story and characters were so well developed was that Disney had already realized the success of animated films depended upon telling emotionally gripping stories that would grab the audience and not let go.  This realization led to an important innovation around the time Pigs was in development: a "story department," separate from the animators, with storyboard artists who would be dedicated to working on a "story development" phase of the production pipeline.

The moderate, but not blockbuster, success of the further "Three Pigs" cartoons was seen as a factor in Walt Disney's decision not to rest on his laurels, but instead to continue to move forward with risk-taking projects, such as the multiplane camera and the first feature-length animated movie. Disney's slogan, often repeated over the years, was "you can't top pigs with pigs."

Controversy and censorship
The short film originally included a scene in which the character of the Big Bad Wolf disguises himself as a Jewish peddler complete with a fake nose, glasses, and beard disguise. In the scene, the actor's voice switches to a Yiddish accent and the music incorporates a fiddle. This scene became more controversial after World War II and was eventually edited in 1948 with a redesign of the Wolf's disguise as a Fuller Brush man, albeit without the disguise, to make it less offensive, and the dialogue changed from "I'm the Fuller Brush Man...I'm giving a free sample!" to "I'm the Fuller Brush Man...I'm working my way through college." using a dopey voice.

Song
The original song composed by Frank Churchill for the cartoon, "Who's Afraid of the Big Bad Wolf?", was a best-selling single, mirroring the people's resolve against the "big bad wolf" of The Great Depression; the song actually became something of an anthem of the Great Depression. When the Nazis began expanding the boundaries of Germany in the years preceding World War II, the song was used to represent the complacency of the Western world in allowing Fuehrer Adolf Hitler to make considerable acquisitions of territory without going to war, and was notably used in Disney animations for the Canadian war effort.

The song was further used as the inspiration for the title of the 1963 play Who's Afraid of Virginia Woolf?, as the sequence has nothing to do with the 1966 film.

The song was parodied in September 1989 during the stunt of WFLZ in Tampa, Florida competing against its nearby competitor WRBQ after WRBQ failed to fill a ransom to be the only CHR format in the Tampa area. WFLZ then started to mock and belittle its competitor, including a "Who's Afraid of the Big Bad Wolf?" parody entitled "Who's Afraid of the Big Bad Q?"

Home media
In the United States, the short was first released on VHS, Betamax and Laserdisc in 1984 as part of its "Cartoon Classics" Home Video series. It came out on VHS in the UK in spring 1996 as part of the Disney Storybook Favourites series, with the Jewish peddler animation restored, albeit with the reworked dialogue. It was released on December 4, 2001, along with its sequels, as part of the Walt Disney Treasures: Silly Symphonies DVD, with the PAL release again retaining the Jewish peddler animation along with the reworked dialogue. The Disney+ release of the short however uses the altered animation in all regions.

It was later included in Walt Disney's Timeless Tales, Vol. 1, released August 16, 2005 (featuring the edited version in the US Silly Symphonies set), which also featured The Pied Piper (1933), The Grasshopper and the Ants (1934), The Tortoise and the Hare (1935) and The Prince and the Pauper (1990).

In those other countries to whom the original 1933 cartoon was first released with original soundtracks in both English and other foreign languages, the uncensored images — with original 1933 soundtracks in both English and other foreign languages — are still issued by Disney corporation in home release videos.

Sequels

Disney produced several sequels to Three Little Pigs, though none were nearly as successful as the original: 
The first of them was The Big Bad Wolf, also directed by Burt Gillett and first released on April 14, 1934. 
In 1936, a second cartoon starring the Three Little Pigs and the Big Bad Wolf followed, with a story based on The Boy Who Cried Wolf. This short was entitled Three Little Wolves and introduced the Big Bad Wolf's three pup sons, all of whom just as eager for a taste of the pigs as their father.
A third cartoon The Practical Pig, was released in 1939, right at the end of the Silly Symphonies' run. In this, Fifer and Piper, again despite Practical's warning, go swimming but are captured by the Wolf, who then goes after Practical only to be caught in Practical's newly built Lie Detector machine.
In 1941, a fourth cartoon, The Thrifty Pig, was distributed by the National Film Board of Canada. In this cartoon, which consists largely of reused footage from the original cartoon, Practical Pig builds his house out of Canadian war bonds, and the Big Bad Wolf representing Nazi Germany is unable to blow his house down.
 Fiddler Pig, Fifer Pig, and Big Bad Wolf appeared in Who Framed Roger Rabbit.
 Characters from the film also appeared on Disney's television series Mickey Mouse Works/House of Mouse and its spinoff direct-to-video films: the three little pigs were featured on the series, the Big Bad Wolf was one of the villains in  Mickey's House of Villains (2002), and Practical Pig was featured in Mickey's Magical Christmas: Snowed in at the House of Mouse (2001). In one episode of the series, the Wolf is portrayed as a popular jazz trumpeter with the stage name, "Big Bad Wolf Daddy," and the pigs play as his backup band.  This possibly may have been an attempt to parody the Warner Bros. cartoon Three Little Bops.

In popular culture

Comics adaptations
The Silly Symphony Sunday comic strip ran a seven-month-long continuation of Three Little Pigs called "The Further Adventures of the Three Little Pigs" from January 18 to August 23, 1936. This was followed by another storyline called "The Practical Pig" from May 1 to August 7, 1938.

The anthology comic book Walt Disney's Comics and Stories introduced a new character, Lil Bad Wolf, the son of the Big Bad Wolf, in issue #52 (January 1945). He was a constant vexation to his father, the Big Bad Wolf, because the little son was not actually bad.  His favorite playmates, in fact, were the Three Pigs. New stories about Lil Bad Wolf appeared regularly in WDC&S for seven years, with the last one appearing in issue #259 (April 1962).

See also
 List of Disney animated films based on fairy tales
 Blitz Wolf

References

External links 

 
Three Little Pigs at the TCM Movie Database
 
 
 Three Little Pigs in the Encyclopedia of Disney Animated Shorts

1930s English-language films
1930s color films
1933 short films
1933 musical comedy films
American animated musical films
1930s Disney animated short films
Best Animated Short Academy Award winners
Films based on fairy tales
Films about music and musicians
Films about pigs
Animated films about wolves
Silly Symphonies
United States National Film Registry films
1933 animated films
Films directed by Burt Gillett
Films produced by Walt Disney
Films based on The Three Little Pigs
Films scored by Frank Churchill
Race-related controversies in animation
Race-related controversies in film
Disney controversies
Ethnic humour
Censored films
American comedy short films
American animated short films
American musical comedy films